Andrew Ballot (born 27 May 1971) is a South African former rugby league footballer who represented South Africa at the 1995 World Cup.

Playing career
Ballot played club football for Doncaster Dragons, Batley Bulldogs and Hunslet Hawks.

He played in all three matches for South Africa at the 1995 World Cup. In 1997 he played in a test match against France, and in the Super League World Nines.

References

1971 births
Living people
South African rugby league players
South Africa national rugby league team players
Place of birth missing (living people)
Rugby league wingers
Rugby league second-rows
Rugby league centres
Doncaster R.L.F.C. players
Batley Bulldogs players
Hunslet R.L.F.C. players
South African expatriate rugby league players
Expatriate rugby league players in England
South African expatriate sportspeople in England